Ellinitsa is a village in the municipal unit of Falaisia, in Arcadia, Greece. It is located on a hillside, 2 km west of Potamia, 3 km southwest of Leontari, 4 km southeast of Paradeisia and 11 km south of Megalopoli. Ellinitsa had a population of 50 in 2011.

Population

See also

List of settlements in Arcadia

References

External links
 History and information about Ellinitsa
 Ellinitsa on GTP Travel Pages

Falaisia
Populated places in Arcadia, Peloponnese